Tappeh-ye Zohurian (also Romanized as Tappeh-ye Zohūrīān; also known as Tappeh-ye Zhohūrīyān) is a village in Sheykh Musa Rural District, in the Central District of Aqqala County, Golestan Province, Iran. At the 2006 census, its population was 205, in 45 families.

References 

Populated places in Aqqala County